Joseph Dorsey may refer to:
 Joseph Dorsey Jr., American boxer
 Joseph Dorsey (politician), American politician from Pennsylvania
 Joseph Dorsey (baseball), American baseball pitcher and outfielder